Mary Irene Levison (8 January 1923 – 12 September 2011) was the first person to petition the Church of Scotland for the ordination of women to the Ministry of Word and Sacrament in 1963. This was achieved five years later and Levison became a minister in 1973. In 1991  she was appointed as Queen's Chaplain, the first woman to hold the position.

Life 

Born Mary Irene Lusk in Oxford on 8 January 1923, she was the fourth child of Mary Theodora Colville, and her husband Reverend David Colville Lusk (1881-1960). Her father was ordained in the United Free Church and at the time of her birth was the Chaplain to the Presbyterian members of the University of Oxford. One of her siblings was the pioneering social worker Janet Lusk (1924 - 1994).

She attended the Oxford High School for Girls for her early education. When the family moved from Oxford to Edinburgh she attended St Monica's School. While there she sat the entrance examination for St Leonard's School in St Andrews which she attended from the age of 13.

She returned to her home town of Oxford for university, studying at undergraduate level at Lady Margaret Hall from 1941. Here she gained a first class degree in philosophy, politics and economics.

As part of her training to be a deaconess (licensed to preach) she returned to Edinburgh to attend St Colm's College and studied for the Bachelor of Divinity at New College (the Faculty of Divinity in the University of Edinburgh). She was awarded a Distinction in Systematic Theology and the Aitken Fellowship which enabled her to spend a semester in Heidelberg and a semester in Basel.

Work in the Church of Scotland 
She was appointed as Deaconess in St Michael's Church in Inveresk, Musselburgh near Edinburgh in 1954 where she served for 4 years.

In 1958 she returned to St Colm's College taking up the post of tutor teaching Christian Doctrine, New Testament Studies and the practical training of the deaconess students.

On Saturday 26 May 1963 Mary Lusk stood at the Bar of the General Assembly of the Church of Scotland to test her call to ministry. The Moderator overseeing the proceedings was the Very Rev James Stuart Stewart. She was given 15 minutes to present her petition to the General Assembly. Her petition was for her Ordination to the Ministry of Word and Sacrament. Her petition was received by the Assembly which instructed the Panel on Doctrine to consider its response and report to the following General Assembly.

This was achieved five years later and Levison became a minister in 1973.

Family and later life

In 1965 she married Reverend Frederick Levison and they moved to the Scottish Borders. When he retired in 1977 they returned to Edinburgh and she then became involved in pastoral care at St Andrew's and St George's Church, Edinburgh.

She was appointed a Chaplain to Her Majesty in Scotland in 1991, and was the first female minister in this role. In 1993 she stood unsuccessfully as Moderator of the General Assembly of the Church of Scotland. She was awarded an honorary doctorate (DD) by the University of Edinburgh in 1994.

She died in Edinburgh on 12 September 2011 and is buried with her parents and other family members in Grange Cemetery. The grave lies on the western wall of the west extension.

Publications

Wrestling with the Church (1992) autobiography

See also 
 Ordination of women in the Church of Scotland

References 

20th-century Ministers of the Church of Scotland
1923 births
2011 deaths
20th-century Scottish women
21st-century Ministers of the Church of Scotland
21st-century Scottish women
People educated at St Leonards School
Alumni of the University of Edinburgh
Alumni of the University of Oxford
Honorary Chaplains to the Queen